Just Buried is a Canadian dark comedy film written and directed by Chaz Thorne. Released in 2007, the film stars Jay Baruchel and Rose Byrne among several other actors.

Plot 
When Oliver Whynacht and his brother Jackie return home for their estranged father's funeral, Oliver is surprised to find out that he has inherited his father's estate which includes a funeral home. Shortly after arriving Henry, the handyman tells Oliver that the funeral home is facing bankruptcy. A stressed Oliver goes out for a night of drinking with Roberta Knickel after which he hits and kills a hiker with his truck. Roberta, who is both the local coroner and funeral home embalmer, helps Oliver stage the body so that it appears like an accident. This becomes Oliver's first paying customer, encouraging the duo to intentionally kill again. Suspicion is raised as the two fight to stay out of jail and stage "accidents" all over town. Due to their mutual partnership Oliver and Roberta begin to fall in love despite Oliver's seductive stepmother Luanne. After Roberta reveals that she is pregnant, the two get married. Shortly after the truth comes out that Roberta murdered Oliver's father to lure him back into town. Roberta was using Oliver to regain ownership of the funeral home which originally belonged to her mother. The film concludes as Roberta kills Oliver and gains possession of the funeral home.

Cast 
Jay Baruchel as Oliver Whynacht
Rose Byrne as Roberta Knickel
Graham Greene as Henry Sanipass
Nigel Bennett as Chief Knickle
Sergio Di Zio as Jackie Whynacht
Reagan Pasternak as Luanne
Thomas Gibson as Charlie Richmond
Brian Downey as Pickles
Slavko Negulic as Armin Imholz
Jeremy Akerman as Rollie Whynacht
Christopher Shore as Wayne Snarr
Michael Pellerin as Sam the Wrecker

Awards 
Just Buried has been nominated for, and won two awards; in 2007, Chaz Thorne won the Atlantic Canadian Award for Best Director at the Atlantic Film Festival. In 2008, Chaz Thorne won another award for his work on the film. The Jury Award for Best of the Fest was given to Thorne at the Santa Cruz Film Festival.

Production & Release 
Just Buried was filmed in locations including Halifax, Nova Scotia, Canada and Windsor, Nova Scotia, Canada. The production designer for the film is William Flemming. Set decoration for the whole movie was done by Darlene Lewis. Costumes for the film were designed by Kate Rose who coordinated with key makeup artist Betty Belmore.

The film was initially released at the Toronto International Film Festival on September 9, 2007. The Canada wide release of the film came a less than a year later on July 25, 2008. The film was also released in the United States on October 3, 2008.

Reception 
The film received mixed reviews from critics and users. , the film holds a 33% approval rating on Rotten Tomatoes, based on nine reviews with an average rating of 4.67/10.

Andrew Barker of Variety called the film "Bloody and irredeemably misanthropic" stating that the film "has enough charm to make for a sporadically enjoyable if wildly uneven entry in the growing body of cheeky corpse comedies." This review also calls attention to several actor's performances in the film including those of Jay Baruchel whom he found misplayed the role. Barker states that the two standout performances were that of Graham Greene who played Henry Sanipass, and Christopher Shore who played Wayne Snarr.

References

External links 
 
 
 Just Buried  at Tribute

2007 films
2007 black comedy films
Canadian black comedy films
English-language Canadian films
Films about death
Funeral homes in fiction
2007 directorial debut films
2007 comedy films
2000s English-language films
2000s Canadian films